Hasnain Khan (born 9 January 1996) is a Pakistani cricketer. He made his first-class debut for Federally Administered Tribal Areas in the 2016–17 Quaid-e-Azam Trophy on 5 November 2016. On debut, he was dismissed without scoring in the first innings, before scoring 25 runs in the second innings. Khan has also played club cricket for Kohat cricket team.

References

External links
 

1996 births
Living people
Pakistani cricketers
Federally Administered Tribal Areas cricketers
Place of birth missing (living people)